Stackebrandtia endophytica is an endophytic bacterium from the genus of Stackebrandtia which has been isolated from the stem of the plant Tripterygium wilfordii from Yunnan in China.

References 

Actinomycetia
Bacteria described in 2015